Alexander Brown McMurdo was a Scottish professional footballer who played in the Scottish League for Queen of the South as an outside forward. He also played in the Football League for Rochdale and Bury.

Career statistics

References 

English Football League players
Clapton Orient F.C. wartime guest players
Scottish footballers
Association football outside forwards
1914 births
Year of death missing
People from Cleland, North Lanarkshire
Scottish Football League players
Bury F.C. players
Queen of the South F.C. players
Rochdale A.F.C. players
Airdrieonians F.C. (1878) wartime guest players
Motherwell F.C. wartime guest players
Footballers from North Lanarkshire